Anne Marie Morris (born 5 July 1957) is a British politician and former lawyer. She has been Member of Parliament (MP) for Newton Abbot since 2010. She was elected as a Conservative, though the party whip has twice been withdrawn from her, once from July to December 2017 and again from January to May 2022.

Early life and career
Morris was born in London on 5 July 1957. She was privately educated at Bryanston School in Dorset and the University of Oxford, where she studied law. After a career working as a corporate lawyer, she became a marketing director for PricewaterhouseCoopers (PwC) and Ernst and Young. She was elected as a councillor on West Sussex County Council for the division of Cuckfield & Lucastes in 2005 and went on to chair the council's Health Scrutiny Committee.

Parliamentary career
Following unsuccessful attempts to be selected as the Conservative candidate for the parliamentary seats of Lewes and Arundel and South Downs, in December 2006 Morris was selected by the local Conservative Association to contest the Newton Abbot constituency. In March 2007, Morris resigned as a councillor in West Sussex.

In the 2010 general election Morris was elected to the seat of Newton Abbot on a 5% swing from the Liberal Democrats. In a close contest, she defeated the incumbent, Richard Younger-Ross, who had been MP for the former constituency of Teignbridge, by 523 votes.

Morris attracted attention during Prime Minister's Questions in July 2012 as she shouted a long question on technical colleges in Devon over a noisy and increasingly amused Commons chamber, whilst waving a left arm held in a sling. Video of her "high-pitched outburst" was widely circulated on social media. Morris said she cared about the issue raised and would "always speak passionately about issues in my constituency."

In 2012, Morris was featured in an investigation by the BBC into MPs who owned property in London but claimed expenses for renting a separate property in the city. She was listed as one of 22 MPs who were undertaking the practice, which was legal, following a cap on the amount MPs could claim for mortgage costs.

In 2013 she was one of 30 Conservative rebels whose votes helped defeat the government's plans for military action in Syria. She later said she made the decision because the military action plans "felt ill-thought through and smacked of regime change", but supported plans for air strikes against ISIL.

In the 2015 general election, she increased her majority to 11,288 and again in the 2017 election to 17,160.

Morris is interested in small businesses, and co-chaired the All-Party Parliamentary Group for Micro Businesses  until 2016.  In 2014 she led the UK's first ever policy review to consider entrepreneurial education for all levels of education, 'An Education System for an Entrepreneur'. She served for three years on the Work and Pensions Committee until March 2015. She served for 6 months on the Public Accounts Committee until May 2017, before rejoining the committee in February 2018. In Newton Abbot she has established Teignbridge Business Buddies, a scheme that offers support to small businesses.

Morris supported the UK leaving the European Union prior to the 2016 referendum.

On 15 November 2018 she submitted a letter of no confidence in Theresa May's leadership.

In October 2020, Morris was one of five Conservative MPs who broke the whip to vote for a Labour opposition day motion to extend the provision of free school meals during school holidays until Easter 2021.

Regarding the December 2020 COVID-19 lockdown, Morris said: "There is nothing new in this document – it's just a rehash of data that has been published before. No attempt has been made to model the impact on the economy in the way that they have modelled the impact the tiers will have on Covid infections. I cannot support the Government in [the 1 December] vote, and everyone I know who has read the document is saying the same."

The Guardian reported in May 2022 that Morris had submitted a letter of no confidence in Prime Minister Boris Johnson.

Whip suspensions

2017
In July 2017, Morris faced calls for the Conservative whip to be withdrawn from her after being recorded on a parliamentary panel using the idiom "nigger in the woodpile" to describe the threat of leaving the EU without a deal, at the launch of a report into the future for the UK's financial sector after Brexit. Morris later stated that the comment was "totally unintentional" and gave an unreserved apology. Prime Minister Theresa May had ordered the Chief Whip to suspend the party whip. The term had been used previously in the House of Lords by Conservative peer Lord Dixon-Smith in 2008.

This incident took place a few weeks after the 2017 general election campaign during which Morris distanced herself from a remark made by her partner and election agent, Roger Kendrick, at a hustings, in which he said problems in the British education system were "due entirely to non-British born immigrants and their high birth rates".

The whip was restored to Morris on 12 December 2017, one day before a crucial vote on the Brexit process. Although Morris voted with the Conservative government, the government was defeated by four votes.

2022
In January 2022, it was reported by Politico that she had again lost the Conservative whip, for voting for an opposition day motion on a VAT cut for energy bills. Morris said she was "disappointed", but "won't apologise for supporting measures that would help my hard-working constituents at a time when the cost of living is rising." The motion was defeated by 319 votes to 229. She said she had submitted a letter of no confidence in Boris Johnson before losing the whip. The party whip was restored on 12 May 2022.

Personal life
Morris lives in Newton Abbot and London. Her former partner was the financier Roger Kendrick, who also formerly served as her election agent. The couple were featured in an article in The Sunday Times in March 2013 on how high earners could limit their tax bills.

References

External links 

 
 
 Hansard – Oral and Written questions raised

1957 births
Living people
21st-century British women politicians
Alumni of Hertford College, Oxford
Conservative Party (UK) councillors
Conservative Party (UK) MPs for English constituencies
Members of West Sussex County Council
Female members of the Parliament of the United Kingdom for English constituencies
Members of the Parliament of the United Kingdom for constituencies in Devon
People educated at Bryanston School
People from Newton Abbot
Politicians from London
UK MPs 2010–2015
UK MPs 2015–2017
UK MPs 2017–2019
UK MPs 2019–present
British women lawyers
21st-century English women
21st-century English people
Women councillors in England
Politicians affected by a party expulsion process
Independent members of the House of Commons of the United Kingdom
British Eurosceptics